The New England Women's Club (est. May 1868) of Boston, Massachusetts, was one of the two earliest women's clubs in the United States, having been founded a couple of months after Sorosis in New York City.

History

Harriet Hanson Robinson, founder of the National Woman Suffrage Association of Massachusetts, and suffragist Caroline Severance worked with Julia Ward Howe to organize the club.

In 1868, "club rooms were first secured in ... the rear of the popular Tremont House. On May 30, 1868, the first meeting to introduce the New England Woman's Club to the public was held in Chickering Hall." The club incorporated in 1887; Sarah H. Bradford, Ednah Dow Littlehale Cheney, Lucy Goddard, Abby W. May, L. M. Peabody, Harriet M. Pittman, Harriet Winslow Sewall, and Kate Gannett Wells served as signatories. By 1893, some 340 members belonged to the club.  Publisher and activist Josephine St. Pierre Ruffin was the first African-American woman to join the organization, when she joined in the mid-1890s.

Although the club was run by and for women, men were allowed to join. A few men had attended the initial meeting, including Ralph Waldo Emerson, James Freeman Clarke, Octavius Brooks Frothingham, Thomas Wentworth Higginson, and Amos Bronson Alcott. Of these, Emerson, Clarke, and Higginson all became members. 

At this time, in Boston, there existed a few other clubs for women, including "the Saturday Morning Club, the Brains Club and the Young Ladies Club, the members of which are in general high-toned persons, interested in intellectual and philanthropic matters." The goal of the New England Women's Club was to "provide a suitable place of meeting in Boston for the convenience of its members, and to promote social enjoyment and general improvement." Committees oversaw club activities with regard to "Art and Literature," "Discussions," "Education," and "Work." "Monday Teas" were held every week.  In its first year, club members set about organizing a horticultural school.

Lectures occurred frequently, given by both club members and invited speakers. Among the many lecturers in the club's first decades were: Louis Agassiz, Amos Bronson Alcott, George Thorndike Angell, Richard Henry Dana, Jr., Ralph Waldo Emerson, Annie Adams Fields, James T. Fields, William Lloyd Garrison, Edward Everett Hale, Thomas Wentworth Higginson, Oliver Wendell Holmes, Sr., Henry James, and Mary Tyler Peabody Mann.

Buildings

Around 1903, the club moved its headquarters from Park Street to the newly constructed New Century Building on Huntington Avenue, designed by architect Josephine Wright Chapman. In 1909, the club moved into the newly constructed Chauncy Hall Building at 585 Boylston Street, and it was there as late as 1922.

Notable members

 Ednah Dow Littlehale Cheney
 Adelaide Avery Claflin
 Sarah Stoddard Eddy
 Julia Ward Howe
 Harriet Ann Jacobs
 Rebecca Richardson Joslin
 Mary Livermore 
 Lucretia Mott
 Elizabeth Palmer Peabody
 Harriet Hanson Robinson
Josephine St. Pierre Ruffin
 Caroline Severance 
 Harriet Winslow Sewall
 Lucy Stone.
 May Alden Ward
Kate Gannett Wells

References

Further reading
 C.P. Cranch. Ode; read at the festival celebrating the birthday of Margaret Fuller Ossoli, held by the New England Women's club, Boston, May 23, 1870. Atlantic Monthly, Aug. 1870.
 J.C. Croly. "New England Woman's Club." The history of the woman's club movement in America. NY: H. G. Allen & Co., 1898; p. 35+ Published under the authority of the General Federation of Women's Clubs
 Ednah Dow Cheney, 1824-1904: memorial meeting, New England Women's Club, Boston, February 20, 1905. Boston: Geo. H. Ellis Co., printers, 1905.

External links
 Harvard University New England Women's Club. Records, 1843-1970: A Finding Aid.
 Boston Athenaeum. Dickens party at the New England Woman’s Club, 1905; photo by Elmer Chickering. "Group portrait taken at a party at which club members dressed in costume as characters from the novels of Charles Dickens. Handwritten key on verso identifies three of the members as Mrs. Julia Ward Howe, the hostess, who founded the club in 1868; Mrs. Daniel Lothrop dressed as Betsey Trotwood; and Mrs. Leo Hunter."

Organizations based in Boston
1868 establishments in Massachusetts
History of Boston
19th century in Boston
Women's clubs in the United States
History of women in Massachusetts
Women in Boston